Rukirabasaija Isingoma Rukidi II was Omukama of the Kingdom of Toro for a few months in 1875. Toro was among the traditional kingdoms located within the borders of modern-day Uganda.  He was the sixth (6th) Omukama of Toro.

Claim to the throne
He was the third son of Kasunga Kyebambe Nyaika, Omukama of Toro from 1866 until 1872, except for a brief period in 1871. No mention is made of his mother. He ascended to the throne following the capture of his brother, Rukirabasaija Nyaika Mukabirere Olimi II, the fifth (5th) Omukama of Toro, by the Bunyoro Army in 1875.

Married life
No mention of his married life is made in the available literature.

Offspring
It is not known how many children were fathered by Omukama Isingoma Rukidi II, or who those children were.

His reign
Omukama Rukidi II was not able to hold on to the throne for very long. He abdicated after a few months in favor of his younger brother, Kakende Nyamuyonjo.

The final years
It is not known where and how Omukama Rukidi II died or what the cause of death was.

Succession table

See also
 Omukama of Toro

References

Toro
19th-century rulers in Africa